Lester Charles Finch  (26 August 1909 – 20 November 1995) was an English football player and manager, best known for his long association with Barnet, and for representing Great Britain at the 1936 Summer Olympics. He started his career at Hadley before moving to local rivals Barnet.

He also represented England in 1941, when England played Wales, but he was not awarded a cap as the game was classed as a Wartime international match.

References

External links

1909 births
1995 deaths
English footballers
Hadley F.C. players
Barnet F.C. players
Footballers at the 1936 Summer Olympics
Olympic footballers of Great Britain
English football managers
Barnet F.C. managers
Association football forwards